Teodor Skuminowicz or Theodorus Skumin (died on 24 September 1668) was a Roman Catholic prelate who served as Auxiliary Bishop of Vilnius (1652–1668) and Titular Bishop of Gratianopolis (1652–1668).

Biography
On 12 August 1652, Teodor Skuminowicz was appointed during the papacy of Pope Innocent X as Auxiliary Bishop of Vilnius and Titular Bishop of Gratianopolis. 
On 29 September 1652, he was consecrated bishop by Marcantonio Franciotti, Cardinal-Priest of Santa Maria della Pace, with Giovan Battista Foppa, Archbishop of Benevento, and Ranuccio Scotti Douglas, Bishop Emeritus of Borgo San Donnino, serving as co-consecrators.
He served as Auxiliary Bishop of Vilnius until his death on 24 September 1668.

References

External links and additional sources
 (for Chronology of Bishops) 
 (for Chronology of Bishops)  
 (for Chronology of Bishops) 
 (for Chronology of Bishops)  

17th-century Roman Catholic bishops in the Polish–Lithuanian Commonwealth
Bishops appointed by Pope Innocent X
1668 deaths